Kennedy Stewart may refer to:

Kennedy Stewart (Canadian politician) (born 1966), Canadian politician and academic
Kennedy Stewart (Irish politician) (born 1882 or 1883), unionist politician in Northern Ireland

See also
Stewart Kennedy (born 1949), Scottish footballer